We're Gonna Make It may refer to:
"We're Gonna Make It (Little Milton song)", a 1965 song by Little Milton
"We're Gonna Make It", a song by Billy Preston	from his 1972 album Music Is My life
"We're Gonna Make It", a song by the Pointer Sisters from their 1981 album Black & White
"We're Gonna Make It", a song by Twisted Sister from their 1983 album You Can't Stop Rock 'n' Roll
"We're Gonna Make It", a song by Damian Marley	from his 2005 album Welcome to Jamrock
"We're Gonna Make It", a song by LL Cool J from his 2006 album Todd Smith and Madea's Family Reunion